The sleepy goby (Psammogobius biocellatus) is a species of fish in the family Gobiidae.

Description
Psammogobius biocellatus is a goby which varies in colour from dark brown to blackish, marked with rows of small black spots along its flanks and 2-3 dark blotches along the back and upper flanks. There is a dark band on the first dorsal fin with more dark bands on the lower part of the caudal fin and narrow bands on the pelvic fins.

Distribution
Psammogobius biocellatus is a widespread species and is distributed East Africa and through the Western Indian Ocean  and the Pacific as far east as Fiji and Samoa, north to Japan and south to Australia.

Habitat and biology
The sleepy goby occurs in the intertidal zone in estuaries, lagoons and coastal rivers, often amongst mangroves where it burrowing into the silty-sand substrate, it may also be found in the lower reaches of freshwater streams. It buries itself in the sand.

References

Taxonomy articles created by Polbot
Fish described in 1837
Sleeper goby